Hartsop above How is a fell in the English Lake District, an outlier of the Helvellyn range in the Eastern Fells. It stands above Brothers Water and the  Ullswater–Ambleside road.

Topography
Although properly the long north-east ridge of Hart Crag, Alfred Wainwright accorded Hartsop above How the status of a separate fell in his Pictorial Guide to the Lakeland Fells and that convention is followed here. The name, with the middle word uncapitalised, is that used on Ordnance Survey maps and has wide support in guidebooks, although it is sometimes hyphenated. Wainwright states that the local name for the fell is Gill Crag.

A three-mile ridge of high ground branches off north-east from the Fairfield horseshoe at Hart Crag. It turns gradually more northward, resembling a billhook in plan. To the north is Deepdale, a long curving valley with a marshy and rather dismal character. The southern boundary of Hartsop above How is formed by Dovedale, a valley of woodlands and waterfalls. Both dales meet the main valley of Kirkstone/Goldrill Beck which flows north through Patterdale to Ullswater.

Hartsop above How has a number of knolls along its length, the principal tops being above Gill Crag—the summit—and Gale Crag.  The ridge is generally grassy, but with considerable rock outcropping, particularly on the Deepdale side. The main faces here are Bleaberry Knott, Gale Crag, Holly Crag and Erne Nest Crag. Gill Crag, The Perch and Black Crag loom above Dovedale. A stone wall follows the crest almost as far as the summit.

At the foot of the Dovedale face and continuing round above Brothers Water is Low Wood. This is an expanse of native woodland. Within the woodland are the remains of Hartsop Hall Mine. This was a lead mine operating at least as far back as the 17th century and closing in 1942. Four levels were driven northward into the fellside of Hartsop above How, but the production of ore was never significant.

Summit
The summit carries a small cairn on grass. The view is good with the craggy heads of Deepdale and Dovedale in close-up.

Ascents
The only practicable line of ascent for walkers is along the ridge, either from the end at Deepdale Bridge, or cutting up the southern side from Cow Bridge and Brothers Water. A path follows the crest and continues across peaty ground toward the rocky top of Hart Crag.

References

Fells of the Lake District
Patterdale